Bleptina flaviguttalis is a species of litter moth in the family Erebidae first described by William Barnes and James Halliday McDunnough in 1912. It is found in North America.

The MONA or Hodges number for Bleptina flaviguttalis is 8373.

References

Further reading

 
 
 

Herminiinae
Articles created by Qbugbot
Moths described in 1912
Moths of North America